Anand Tucker (born 24 June 1963) is a film director and producer based in London. He began his career directing factual television programming and adverts. He co-owns the production company Seven Stories.

Personal life
Tucker was born in Thailand to an Indian father and German mother. He attended Island School and moved to the UK at the age of 18.

He has two children with his partner, director Sharon Maguire.

Filmography as director

Feature films
 Saint-Ex (1996)
 Hilary and Jackie (1998)
 Shopgirl (2005)
 And When Did You Last See Your Father? (2007)
 Red Riding: The Year of Our Lord 1983 (2009)
 Leap Year (2010)
 The Critic (2023)

Television Series and Documentaries
 Bookmark: The Vampire's Life (1993)
 Champions: Football Crazy (1994)
 Omnibus: The Greatest Living Painter - De Kooning (1994)
 Gothica (an ABC pilot series) (2013)
 Indian Summers (2015) (4 episodes)

Commercials / Advertising
 Rover – "Rover 600 - Dah" (1996)
 Carlsberg – "Carlsberg Euro 1996" (1996)
 British Gas Company – "Loch Ness" (1999)
 McDonald's – "Hook's Back" (2002)

Filmography as producer
 Girl With A Pearl Earring (2003)
 Incendiary (2008)
 The Railway Man (2013)
 Selection Day (2018)

References

External links
 

People educated at Island School
British film directors
British film producers
British male screenwriters
British television directors
British television producers
British television writers
1963 births
Living people
Anand Tucker
British people of German descent
British people of Indian descent
Thai emigrants to the United Kingdom
British male television writers